Snowboarding at the 2016 Winter Youth Olympics was held at the Kanthaugen Freestyle Arena, Lillehammer and Hafjell in Øyer, Norway from 14 to 19 February. The snowboard cross was added for each gender.

Medal summary

Medal table

Boys' Events

Girls' Events

Mixed event
Will include athletes from freestyle skiing

Qualification system
All quotas were distributed using the results of the 2015 World Junior Championships. Each nation was allowed to enter one athlete per event. The total quota was 80 athletes (32 in snowboard cross, 24 in slopestyle and 24 in halfpipe).

Halfpipe

Slopestyle

Snowboard cross

Summary

References

External links
Results Book – Snowboarding

 
2016 Winter Youth Olympics events
2016